Lyubinsky District is an administrative and municipal district (raion), one of the thirty-two in Omsk Oblast, Russia. It is located in the southwestern central part of the oblast. Its administrative center is the urban locality (a work settlement) of Lyubinsky. Population: 37,735 (2010 Census);  The population of the administrative center accounts for 27.1% of the district's total population.

References

Notes

Sources

Districts of Omsk Oblast